Gartmann is a surname. Notable people with the surname include:

 Aby Gartmann (1930–2018), Swiss bobsledder
 Arnold Gartmann (1904–1980), Swiss bobsledder
 Arnold Gartmann (luger) (born 1941), Swiss luger

See also
 Garmann
 Gartman